Radius Ventures is a venture capital firm located in New York that invests in expansion-stage health and life sciences companies.
Founded in 1997 by Jordan S. Davis and Daniel C. Lubin, Radius has raised in excess of $200 million in three funds and has invested in over 40 companies since inception. Radius invests in leading-edge, growth equity and expansion-stage health and life sciences companies.

Portfolio Companies 
Current and past investments include:

 ActiveHealth Management (Aetna)
 Aethon 
 Ambit Biosciences (Nasdaq: AMBI)
 AMICAS (Merge Healthcare)
 Amicus Therapeutics (Nasdaq: FOLD)
 Athersys (Nasdaq: ATHX)
 BEI Medical Systems (Boston Scientific)
 Bio-Lok International (HealthPoint Capital)
 BioStorage Technologies(Brooks Automation)
 Conor Medsystems (Johnson & Johnson)
 Corus Pharma (Gilead Sciences)

 EndoGastric Solutions
 Health Language (Wolters Kluwer)
 Healthsense(GreatCall Inc.)
 Heartscape Technologies (Roper Industries)
 Management Health Solutions
 Medingo (Roche)
 Minimally Invasive Devices
 NuGEN
 Tabula Rasa HealthCare
 Tactile Systems Technology
 U-Systems (GE Healthcare)

References 
Use "month day, year" format for publication dates

Financial services companies established in 1997
Companies based in New York City
Venture capital firms of the United States